Native Tongue(s) may refer to:

Books 
Native Tongues (book), a non-fiction book about languages by Charles Berlitz published in 1982
Native Tongue (Carl Hiaasen novel), a novel by Carl Hiaasen published in 1991
Native Tongue (Elgin novel), a feminist science fiction novel by American writer Suzette Haden Elgin published in 1984

Language 
First language, the language a human being learns from birth
Native Tongue Title, a term referring to compensation for linguicide

Music 
Native Tongue, a 2018 album and single of the same name by Australian singer-songwriter Mo'Ju 

"Native Tongue", a song by Sara Groves from her 2015 album Floodplain

Native Tongue (Poison album), a 1993 album by Poison

Native Tongue (Switchfoot album), a 2019 album by Switchfoot

Native Tongues, an American hip hop collective